The 1893 VMI Keydets football team represented the Virginia Military Institute (VMI) in their third season of organized football. VMI went 3-1, suffering their first loss in the short team history.

Schedule

References

VMI
VMI Keydets football seasons
VMI Keydets football